Ceres is an unincorporated community in Bland County, Virginia, United States. Ceres has a post office with ZIP code 24318.

Climate
The climate in this area has mild differences between highs and lows, and there is adequate rainfall year-round.  According to the Köppen Climate Classification system, Ceres has a marine west coast climate, abbreviated "Cfb" on climate maps.

References

Unincorporated communities in Bland County, Virginia
Unincorporated communities in Virginia